The Cassville Crossroads Historic District is a historic district located in the community of Cassville, at the junction of CR 571 and CR 528, in Jackson Township, Ocean County, New Jersey. The district was added to the National Register of Historic Places on August 26, 1982 for its significance in agriculture, architecture, art, commerce and religion. It includes nine contributing buildings and one contributing structure.

Gallery of contributing properties

References

Jackson Township, New Jersey
National Register of Historic Places in Ocean County, New Jersey
Historic districts on the National Register of Historic Places in New Jersey
New Jersey Register of Historic Places
Georgian architecture in New Jersey
Greek Revival architecture in New Jersey
Gothic Revival architecture in New Jersey